Stephen R. Hart (born March 11, 1958) is a Canadian actor known for his height (6'11") and deep voice. He is also known for his role as "The Voice" on The Current. Hazel-eyed, with pitch black hair, Hart has a reputation for playing sinister villains. His credits include notable films such as Resident Evil: Apocalypse, Silent Hill, Shoot 'Em Up and Max Payne. He also played the main antagonist in an episode of the NBC series Fear Itself.

Personal life 

In 1976 he served at the Montreal Olympics as an armed escort for International Olympic Delegates, as a member of the Canadian Armed Forces. He sang a duet of the song "Let's call the whole thing off", with Canadian former Prime Minister Kim Campbell, on an episode of The Current. Hart also achieved celebrity status in Canada, while performing as 'The Scandinavian Giant' (due to his Danish ancestry) with Carnival Diablo, a modern sideshow. Stunts included bending iron bars in his teeth, surviving an electric chair, general strong-man/giant acts from 1999 to 2002. He appeared as a celebrity cook on the Christine Cushing cooking show, broadcast on the Food Network in 2002.

Filmography

References

External links

 Stephen R. Hart's official MySpace page

Living people
1958 births
20th-century Canadian male actors
21st-century Canadian male actors
Canadian male film actors
Canadian male television actors
Canadian male voice actors